The Aline Barnsdall Hollyhock House in the East Hollywood neighborhood of Los Angeles, California, was designed by Frank Lloyd Wright originally as a residence for oil heiress Aline Barnsdall (built, 1919–1921). The building is now the centerpiece of the city's Barnsdall Art Park. In July 2019, along with seven other buildings designed by Wright in the 20th century, it was added to the UNESCO World Heritage List. It is the first time modern American architecture has been recognized on the World Heritage List. The Hollyhock House is noted for developing an influential architectural aesthetic, which combined indoor and outdoor living spaces.

History
Aline Barnsdall originally intended the house to be part of an arts and live-theater complex on a property known as Olive Hill, but the larger project was never completed. This was Wright's second project in California (the first one being the George C. Stewart House, 1909, in Montecito). Atypically for Wright, he was not able to personally supervise much of the construction due to his preoccupation with designing the Imperial Hotel in Japan at the time. He delegated many of the responsibilities involved in completing the house to his assistant, Rudolph Schindler, and his son, Lloyd Wright. The elder Wright was fired from the project in 1921 due to cost overages on the project.

Disillusioned by the costs of construction and maintenance, Barnsdall donated the house to the city of Los Angeles in 1927 under the stipulation that a fifteen-year lease be given to the California Art Club for its headquarters. The club was there until 1942 when the house was almost demolished. The house has been used as an art gallery and as a United Service Organizations (USO) facility over the years. Beginning in 1974, the city sponsored a series of restorations, but the structure was damaged in the 1994 Northridge earthquake. It was again restored, and was open to the public as of June 2005.

The U.S. Department of the Interior designated Hollyhock House a National Historic Landmark in 2007. It was the seventh site in the city of Los Angeles to receive that designation. The house was included in a list of all time "top ten" Los Angeles houses in a Los Angeles Times survey of experts in December 2008.

In 2005, Project Restore initiated a 10-year restoration project. Project Restore is a non-profit organization dedicated "to the historic restoration and preservation of the civic integrity of the City of Los Angeles." The restoration included work on the building's floor, wood, doors, windows, art stone, and plaster. The restored building was opened to the public in 2015. 

In January 2015 it was announced that, following extensive renovations, the house would once again open for tours on 13 February. The 24-hour event drew large crowds through the night, with many waiting in line for over three hours for admittance.

In 2015, the National Park Service submitted the Hollyhock House along with nine other Frank Lloyd Wright properties to a tentative list for designation as World Heritage Site. Revised proposals were submitted in 2018. Eight properties were ultimately inscribed on the World Heritage List as part of a submission called "The 20th-Century Architecture of Frank Lloyd Wright" in July 2019. When Hollyhock House together with the seven other buildings in the US were added to the UNESCO World Heritage List, it was the first time that modern American architecture had been recognized by that organization.

Features

As with many of Wright's residences, it has an "introverted" exterior with windows that seem hidden from the outside, and is not easy to decode from the outside. The house is arranged around a central courtyard with one side open to form a kind of theatrical stage (never used as such), and a complex system of split levels, steps and roof terraces around that courtyard. The design features exterior walls that are tilted back at 85 degrees (which helps provide a "Mayan" appearance sometimes referred to as the Mayan Revival style), leaded art glass in the windows, a grand fireplace with a large abstract bas-relief, and a moat. Water is meant to flow from a pool in the courtyard through a tunnel to this inside moat, and out again to a fountain.

The front doors are stepped similarly to the entryway. The split doors rest on pins and swing open easily despite their massive weight. The keyhole is concealed with a decorative flap.

The hollyhock (Aline Barnsdall's favorite flower) is used as a central theme to the house, with many symmetrical decorations adapting the plant's general appearance. Planters are decorated with the motif and filled with the plants themselves, and Wright's stained glass windows feature a highly stylized hollyhock pattern. An interesting feature is the mitered glass corners at the windows; an early idea Wright later used at Fallingwater.

Hollyhock House features an entertainment room immediately to the right of the entrance. This room contains possibly the first built-in entertainment center, complete with LP-sized cabinets along the floor. Other notable rooms include a child's play area as well as a modernist kitchen, which long housed the museum gift shop.

Like many houses designed by Wright, it proved to be better as an aesthetic work than as a livable dwelling. Water tended to flow over the central lawn and into the living room, and the flat roof terraces were conceived without an understanding of Los Angeles' rains. The cantilevered concrete also did not stand up well to the area's earthquakes.

There were a considerable number of revisions. Two smaller structures, called Studio Residence A and B, were built on the grounds. Residence A still stands. The client also commissioned a private kindergarten which was never built. The property also includes a smaller building designed by modernist architect Richard Neutra.

Use in film production

The house and grounds were used as the temple of the Piranha Women in 1989's Cannibal Women in the Avocado Jungle of Death.

Friends of Hollyhock House (FOHH)
The FOHH provide an increased public awareness of Frank Lloyd Wright, Aline Barnsdall, and Hollyhock House through public tours, special events, and the Friends of Hollyhock House Library. The library is a small research library that contains books and articles on Frank Lloyd Wright and Aline Barnsdall. All docents are members of the Friends of Hollyhock House.

Gallery

See also
 Los Angeles Historic-Cultural Monuments in Hollywood
 List of Registered Historic Places in Los Angeles
 Storer House
 California Art Club
 Ennis House
 List of Frank Lloyd Wright works
 Storrer, William Allin. The Frank Lloyd Wright Companion. University Of Chicago Press, 2006,  (S.208)

References

External links

 
 30 minute documentary video on the restoration of the house
, with 2018 KCET walk-through video.
Website of Project Restore

Houses completed in 1921
Frank Lloyd Wright buildings
Los Angeles Historic-Cultural Monuments
National Historic Landmarks in California
Houses on the National Register of Historic Places in Los Angeles
Mayan Revival architecture
Modernist architecture in California
Historic house museums in California
Museums in Los Angeles
Buildings and structures in Hollywood, Los Angeles
East Hollywood, Los Angeles
Hollywood Boulevard
1921 establishments in California